Phragmataecia impura is a species of moth of the family Cossidae. It is found in India, Nepal, southern China (Hainan, Zhejiang and Guangxi), Vietnam, Laos, Thailand and Java.

References

Moths described in 1891
Phragmataecia